Liu Daomin (born 15 March 1999) is a Chinese Paralympic swimmer. She represented China at the 2020 Summer Paralympics.

Career
Daomin represented China in the women's 100 metre breaststroke SB6 event at the 2020 Summer Paralympics and won a silver medal.

References

1999 births
Living people
Paralympic swimmers of China
Chinese female breaststroke swimmers
Swimmers from Guizhou
S6-classified Paralympic swimmers
Medalists at the World Para Swimming Championships
Swimmers at the 2020 Summer Paralympics
Medalists at the 2020 Summer Paralympics
Paralympic silver medalists for China
Paralympic medalists in swimming
21st-century Chinese women